Matruza Hossain Mollah is a Bangladesh Nationalist Party politician and the former Member of Parliament of Comilla-7.

Career
Mollah was elected to parliament from Comilla-7 as a Bangladesh Nationalist Party candidate in 1979.

Death
Mollah died on 16 September 2017.

References

Bangladesh Nationalist Party politicians
2017 deaths
2nd Jatiya Sangsad members
Dhaka College alumni
Notre Dame College, Dhaka alumni